Reginald I of Guelders (1255 – October 9, 1326 in Monfort) was Count of Guelders from January 10, 1271 until his death. He was the son of Otto II, Count of Guelders and Philippe of Dammartin.

In 1276 he married Irmgard of Limburg, only daughter and heiress of Waleran IV, Duke of Limburg. 
In 1279 he became Duke of Limburg and when Irmgard died childless in 1283, he became the only ruler of the Duchy of Limburg. He lost this title after losing the Battle of Woeringen in 1288.

In 1286 he remarried Margaret of Flanders (1272–1331), daughter of Guy, Count of Flanders from his second marriage, with Isabelle of Luxembourg. They had 5 children:
 Reginald II (1295–1343)
 Margaret, married Dietrich VIII, Count of Cleves
 Guy
 Elisabeth (died 1354), abbess at Cologne
 Philippa, nun at Cologne.

Financially ruined after the Battle of Woeringen, Guelders came under the influence of his father-in-law, the Count of Flanders. From 1318, he was replaced by his son, who imprisoned his father in 1320 in the Montfort Castle. 
Reginald I died here 6 years later.

1255 births
1326 deaths
People from Gelderland
Counts of Guelders